Zaporozhsky may refer to:

 Alexander Zaporozhsky, a former colonel in Russia’s SVR foreign intelligence agency
 Zaporozhskoye, a settlement in Karelia, Russia

See also 
 Zaporizhzhia (disambiguation)
 ZAZ Zaporozhets, a Ukrainian automobile series